Bryan Wong Lok Kiang (born on 30 January 1971) is a Singaporean television host and actor.

Career
Wong began his career as a child actor in 1981 and featured in several popular children's programmes on SBC. He began performing modelling assignments and commercials while still a teenager. In 1994, he joined TCS as a full-time artiste after a short stint as an interior designer. Although his first hosting role was for the teenage lifestyle programme Gen Y, it was the infotainment programme City Beat during the late 1990s that first exposed him to television audiences. While his co-hosts Kym Ng and Sharon Au were winning awards at the annual Star Awards, he was not well received by the general public. He later stated that he had planned to resign several times but did not have a choice as he had to support his family. In 2000, he and several fellow artistes left TCS to join the newly formed SPH MediaWorks. While with MediaWorks, he became known for co-hosting Channel U's popular talent-search show Snap with Ng and their partnership was praised by audiences. He was nominated for Best Entertainment Presenter at the 2002 Asian Television Awards. In 2005, MediaCorp (successor of TCS) absorbed MediaWorks and he was one of nineteen artistes transferred over.

As an actor, Wong is a recognised face in mainland China after starring in a number of China, Hong Kong and Taiwan productions while with SPH MediaWorks, most notably in Eternity: A Chinese Ghost Story and the wuxia series Chinese Paladin. He played the main lead role in MediaWorks' final drama series Zero and also starred in Honour and Passion opposite Tay Ping Hui, Huang Wenyong and Rui En.

Since returning to MediaCorp, Wong has enjoyed more success as a host. He co-hosted the popular long-running home makeover show Home Decor Survivor (摆家乐) with Mark Lee, for which he won his first hosting award, the Best Variety Show Host award, at the 2006 Star Awards. He was awarded the All-Time Favourite Artiste after winning the Top 10 Most Popular Male Artistes award from 1998–1999, 2005-2012 respectively with Chen Hanwei at the 2014 ceremony. He won the Favourite Variety Show Host audience poll, beating hot favourite Fann Wong, at the 2012 Star Awards.

Personal life
Wong grew up in a kampong in Kembangan in 70s–80s Singapore. He lives with his sister Varilyn "Val" and his mother Margaret in an apartment in Bedok.

Wong was educated at Tanjong Katong Secondary Technical School, where he first discovered an interest in "do it yourself" interior designing and carpentry.

He now co-owns an interior design firm called 'Home by Bryan Wong' which does not accept walk-in customers.

Filmography

Special programmes
1994
Grand Launching of Television Corporation of Singapore (TCS) on 1 October

Variety and infotainment programmes
 1994
能耐极限大挑战
Gen-Y Y-人王
1995
脑力加油站
1995–2000
City Beat 城人杂志
1996
Mavis Hee Mini Concert 许美静迷你音乐会
Jacky Cheung Mini Concert 张学友迷你音乐会
Mooncake Festival Variety Show
1998
Comedy Nite 1998 搞笑行动 1998
1999
Comedy Nite 1999 搞笑行动 1999
2000–2001
Dream Challengers 圆梦新计划
Happy Rules 开心就好
'Live' Unlimited 综艺无界限
Snap 全星总动员
2002
Snap Special – Chinese New Year 全星总动员 – 新年特别版
Snap 2 全星总动员 2
Happy Rules 开心就好
Ready Steady Go 全民出动抢鲜玩
Snap Special – Channel U's 2nd Year Anniversary 全星总动员 – 优频道2周年纪念版
2003
Ren Ci Charity Show 2003 仁心慈爱照万千2003 (Performance: Flag dance)
Add Your Service 服务加加加
Snap Special – Romance Of The Book and Sword 全星总动员 – 书剑总动员版
Ready Steady Go II 全民出动抢鲜玩 2
Precious Home 家有宝贝
Everybody's Talking – (Translator of Hainanese for SARS prevention programme) 人人有话说 – 担任海南翻译
Oooh! 元气大搜查
2004
Ren Ci Charity Show 2004 仁心慈爱照万千2004 (Performance: Fire twirling stunt)
Snap 3 全星总动员 3
Mall & More 夺宝三响炮
Street Wise 街头大排党
2005
Ren Ci Charity Show 2005 仁心慈爱照万千2005 (Duo car stunt performance (With Xie Shao Guang))
Lunar New Year's Eve Special – Year Of Rooster 天鸡报喜贺新春
KP Club 鸡婆俱乐部
101 Shopping Guide 陪你去Shopping
The NKF Cancer Show 1 群星照亮千万心之风雨同舟献真心 (Duo performance (With Kym Ng): Impersonation/costume changing skit) 
Foodball Tic Tac Goal 食在好球
Rail Adventure 男得风光
Love Bites 2 缘来就是你2
Star Idol 明星偶像
The Cancer Charity Show 癌过有晴天
Home Decor Survivor 摆家乐
I Love Shopping II 陪你去Shopping 2
Cenosis Show
Affairs Of The Heart 2005 心手相连2005
2006
Ren Ci Charity Show 2006 仁心慈爱照万千2006 (外景主持)
Dollar & Sense 神机妙算
Its Showtime! (Judge) 全民创意争霸赛 (评审)
Giant Stars 2006 Giant 星光灿烂 2006
Where The Queue Starts 排排站，查查看
The Ultimate Comedian 爆笑新人王
What's Art? 什么艺思?
The 7-Eleven Game Show 7-Eleven抢先夺快争第一
Home Decor Survivor 2 摆家乐 2
Who's Naughty and Nice 黑白讲
2007
Ren Ci Charity Show 2007 仁心慈爱照万千2007 (Piano performance: Ebony & Ivory)
Lunar New Year's Eve Special – Year Of Pig 金猪贺岁庆肥年 (@ Studio)
Chingay Parade Of Dreams 2007 妆艺大游行 之 奇思梦想 2007
Where The Queue Starts 2 排排站，查查看 2
Giant Stars 2007 星光灿烂 2007
BRAND'S Stay Sharp Stay In Game 眼明心清我最行
Citispa Beauty Perfection 2 Citispa 完美大挑战 2
Maria Not At Home Maria 今天不在家
Law by Law 赢了Law
Home Decor Survivor 3 摆家乐 3
My Star Guide 2 – Tasmania 我的导游是明星 2 (Last Episode)
Princesses and the Dude 扮美达人
2008
Fortune Festival at Giant 2008 爱上Giant过肥年 2008
Lunar New Year's Eve Special – Year of Mouse 八方祥瑞鼠来宝 (@ Studio, Host/Skit performance)
Chingay Parade Of Dreams 2008 妆艺大游行 之 奇思梦想 2008
Glamour Mum and The Dude 辣妈好时尚
Giant Stars 2008 Giant 星光灿烂 2008
Citispa 完美大挑战 3 Citispa Beauty Perfection 3
Junior Home Decor Survivor 迷你摆家乐 (as Mentor)
My Star Guide 3 – Turkey 我的导游是明星3 – 土耳其
Find Me A New Boss 职场大哥大
2009
Lunar New Year's Eve Special – Year of Ox 牛转乾坤喜临门 (@ Studio)
Fortune Festival at Giant 2009 爱上Giant过肥年 2009
Destination Most Wanted 优游天下 (Took 9 months to film in 2008)
Where The Queue Starts 3 排排站，查查看 3
The Chinese Challenge 2009 (Guest) 华文? 谁怕谁! 2009 (嘉宾)
Live a Life U质人生
Fashion Asia 亚洲时尚风 – Bangkok 曼谷
Food Hometown 2 – Hainan 美食寻根 – 海南
Result is All 美就是一切
My Star Guide 4 – Turkey 我的导游是明星4 – 瑞士
Home Decor Survivor 4 摆家乐4
New City Beat 城人新杂志
SPD Charity Show 2009 真情无障碍 2009 (Stunt challenge: 3 hours non-stop treadmill running)
SMRT Challenge 2009 SMRT大挑战 2009
2010
Fortune Festival at Giant 2010 爱上Giant过肥年 2010
Lunar New Year's Eve Special 2010 普天同庆金虎年2010
Citispa Beauty Perfection 2
New City Beat 2 城人新杂志 2
Don't Forget The Lyrics (Celebrities series) 我要唱下去 (艺人版 Celebrities series) (Guest appearance)
Giant Stars 2010 Giant 星光灿烂 2010
Behind Every Job 美差事, 苦差事
Singapore Hit Awards 2010 新加坡金曲奖 (Guest awards presenter)
Under 1 Roof @ Courts 家家有Courts 家家乐
3 Plus 1 Series 2 三菜一汤 2 I.(as Guest, VS 李铭顺) II.(as Guest, partner with Nono VS 黄靖伦&何维健)
2010 Golden Awards 金视奖2010
Adventures with SMRT SMRT新游记
2011
Lunar New Year's Eve Special – Year of Rabbit 金兔呈祥喜迎春 (@ Chinatown, Guest performance)
Fortune Festival at Giant 2011 爱上GIANT 过肥年 2011
Chingay 2011 妆艺大游行 2011
Star Awards 2011 Show 1 红星大奖2011第一场
SPD Charity Show 2011 真情无障碍 2011 (Performance: Mouth art painting in 3 hours)
Renaissance 旧欢.心爱
Makan Unlimited 新马美食一家亲
Under 1 Roof @ Courts 家家有Courts, 家家乐!
Volkswagen Treasure Trails Volkswagen 寻宝乐 
3 Plus 1 Series 3 三菜一汤3 (as Guest, VS 林明伦)
Buffet Buffet 2 永远吃不肥 2 (as Panel of Critics 美食鉴定团, Ep 2)
Behind Every Job 2 美差事, 苦差事2
My Star Guide 6 – Eastern Europe (Finland/Sweden/Norway/Denmark) 我的导游是名星 6 – 东欧 (芬兰/瑞典/挪威/丹麦)
SMRT Challenge 2011 SMRT大挑战 2011
2012
Lunar New Year's Eve Special – Year of Dragon 金龙腾飞庆丰年 (@ Studio, Guest appearance)
The Art Effect 处处有艺术 
Knock Knock Who's There 啊! 是你到我家
Fortune Festival at Giant 2012 爱上GIANT过肥年 2012
Way To Go, Singapore! 新加坡, 自有一套!
"东方水城 梦幻之夜" 第十五届中国苏州国际旅游节开幕式暨第二届金鸡湖商务旅游节启动仪式
Just Noodles 面对面 (Guest appearance, Ep 14)
Share Something 我爱公开
Jobs Around the World 走遍天涯打工乐
S.N.A.P. 熠熠星光总动员
2012 Golden Awards 金视奖2012
2013
Fortune Festival at Giant 2013 爱上Giant过肥年 2013
Behind Every Job 3 美差事, 苦差事之帮你找事做
My Great Partner 大小拍档
The I-Weekly Show i不释手
Where The Queue Starts 4 排排站，查查看4
2014
Fortune Festival at Giant 2014 爱上Giant过肥年 2014
Minute to Win It : Singapore
Hear Me Out 有话要说
2015
Fortune Festival at Giant 2015 爱上Giant过肥年 2015

Television series

Awards and nominations

References

External links
Bryan's Personal Blog / Photos
Profile on xin.msn.com

1971 births
Living people
Singaporean people of Chinese descent
Singaporean male television actors
Singaporean television presenters
Singaporean businesspeople